Crowley Independent School District is a public school district based in Crowley, Texas (USA).  The Superintendent of Schools is Dr. Michael McFarland.

In addition to Crowley, the district also serves portions of Fort Worth, and Edgecliff Village in south central Tarrant County and Burleson in north central of Johnson County. A small portion of northern Johnson County also lies within the district.

Schools
There are a total of 25 campuses in Crowley Independent School District

High Schools (Grades 10-12)

 Crowley High School (Crowley)
 North Crowley High School (Fort Worth)

Ninth Grade Campuses (Grades 9)

 Crowley Ninth Grade Campus (Crowley) 
 North Crowley Ninth Grade Campus (Fort Worth)

Middle Schools (Grades 6-8)

 H.F. Stevens Middle School (Crowley) 
 Crowley Middle School (Fort Worth) 
 Summer Creek Middle School (Fort Worth)
 Richard Allie Middle School (Crowley)

Elementary Schools (Grades PK-5)
Bess Race Elementary School (Crowley)
Dallas Park Elementary School (Fort Worth) 
David L. Walker Elementary School (Fort Worth)
Deer Creek Elementary School (Crowley) 
J.A. Hargrave Elementary School (Fort Worth) 
Jackie Carden Elementary School (Fort Worth)
June W. Davis Elementary School (Fort Worth)
Mary Harris Elementary School (Fort Worth)
Meadowcreek Elementary School (Fort Worth) 
Oakmont Elementary School (Fort Worth) 
Parkway Elementary School (Fort Worth) 
S.H. Crowley Elementary School (Crowley)
Sidney H. Poynter Elementary School (Fort Worth)
Sue Crouch Elementary School (Fort Worth) 
Sycamore Elementary School (Fort Worth)

Other Campuses
 Crowley Learning Center (Crowley) 
 B.R. Johnson Career & Tech Center (Crowley)

References

External links
Crowley ISD

School districts in Tarrant County, Texas
School districts in Johnson County, Texas
Crowley, Texas
School districts in Fort Worth, Texas